Guineica is a genus of beetles in the family Cicindelidae, containing the following species:

 Guineica inaequidens (Brouerius van Nidek, 1959)
 Guineica tetrachoides (Gestro, 1876)

References

Cicindelidae